This list covers the locomotives of the Imperial Railways in Alsace-Lorraine (Reich railways in Alsace-Lorraine) (EL) and those of the Chemins de fer d'Alsace et de Lorraine (AL). Alsace-Lorraine is a region in northeastern France that was under the control of the German Empire between 1871 and 1920, during which time its railway network was expanded and operated by the EL.

Locomotive classification and numbering 

The Reich railways in Alsace-Lorraine numbered their locomotives sequentially and gave them names as well. The names depended on the type of locomotive.

In addition the locomotive fleet was organised into classes from the outset. The system was based on the Bavarian state railways with capital letters followed by Arabic numerals.

A – Express and passenger train locomotives (named after rivers)
B – Locomotives for mixed traffic (named after rivers)
C – Goods train locomotives (named after towns and villages)
D – Tank locomotives (named after people, forenames)
E - Narrow gauge locomotives (unnamed)

A class number was issued to each delivery batch.

In 1906 all the vehicles were renumbered and a new classification system was introduced, this time based on the Prussian system. The different types of locomotive were given a specific range of numbers.

S - Express train locomotives (numbers 1–500)
P - Passenger train locomotives (numbers 501–1000)
G - Goods train locomotives (numbers 1001–2000)
T - Tank locomotives (numbers 2001–2600)

In 1912 the locomotives were again given new numbers and in some cases were reclassified. In addition, locomotive names were done away with.

S - Express train locomotives (numbers 1–2000)
P - Passenger train locomotives (numbers 2001–3000)
G - Goods train locomotives (numbers 3001–6000)
T - Goods train locomotives (numbers 6001–9000)

Narrow gauge locomotives were given the class letter ‘’’T’’’ and number range 3001–3042. This meant that two engines could have the same number. Older locomotives were no longer renumbered and retained their number until retirement.

In 1919 the French regional railway, “Chemins de fer d' Alsace et de Lorraine“ (AL) took over the system and continued with it until 1938, when the company went into the French national railways, the SNCF.

Steam locomotives

Passenger and express train locomotives

Goods train locomotives

Tank locomotives

Narrow gauge locomotives 

The narrow gauge locomotives of the Reich railways were built for the metre gauge lines of Lützelburg–Drulingen/Pfalzburg, Colmar–Ensisheim and Colmar–Markolsheim.

See also 
History of rail transport in France
History of rail transport in Germany
Länderbahnen
Alsace-Lorraine
UIC classification

References 

 
 
 
 
 

Defunct railway companies of Germany
Locomotives of Germany
Deutsche Reichsbahn-Gesellschaft locomotives

Locomotive classification systems
Alsace-Lorraine
Alsace-Lorraine locomotives
Alsace-Lorraine locomotives